Rinehart is an unincorporated community in Vernon County, in the U.S. state of Missouri.

History
A post office called Rinehart was established in 1882, and remained in operation until 1936. The community has the name of Johiel H. Rinehart, a pioneer citizen.

References

Unincorporated communities in Vernon County, Missouri
Unincorporated communities in Missouri